Palm Records (short for Productions Artistiques Littéraires et Musicales) was a French jazz record label founded by Jef Gilson in the early 1970s.

Discography
PALM 1: Gilson Malagasy 	1972
PALM 2: Jef Gilson / Jean-Charles Capon / Gilbert Rovere / Jean-Luc Ponty / Lionel Maga Concert À La M.J.C. Colombes  1972
PALM 3: Christian Vander / Frank Raholison	Fiesta In Drums 1973
PALM 4: Sylvain Marc / Del Rabenja	Madagascar Now - Maintenant 'Zao 1973
PALM 5: Gilson	Malagasy At Newport-Paris 	1973
PALM 6: Christian Vander	Christian Vander Et Les 3 Jef 
PALM 7: Philippe Maté / Jef Gilson	Workshop 	1973
PALM 8: Byard Lancaster / Sylvain Marc / Steve McCall	Us 1974
PALM 9: Byard Lancaster - Clint Jackson III	Mother Africa 	1974
PALM 10: Khan Jamal	Give The Vibes Some 	1974
PALM 11/12: Byard Lancaster / Keno Speller	Exactement 
PALM 13: Baikida Carroll	Orange Fish Tears 	1974
PALM 16: Machi Oul	Quetzalcoatl 	1975
PALM 17: Jacques Thollot	Watch Devil Go 	1975
PALM 18: Jef Gilson	Anthology Jef Gilson 1945/1975 : The Beginning Of Jef Gilson 1975
PALM 20: Jef Gilson	Anthology Jef Gilson 1945/1975 : The Big Band Era 	1975
PALM 22: François Jeanneau	Une Bien Curieuse Planète 	1975
PALM 23: François Couturier / André Jaume / Fred Ramamonjiarisoa	Nadja / Salana-Resaka 1975
PALM 24: Raymond Boni	Rêve En Couleurs 	1976
PALM 25: Frank Lowe	The Other Side 	1977
PALM 26: Jean-Charles Capon / Philippe Maté / Butch Morris / Serge RahoersonUntitled 1977
PALM 27: Jean Peron Garvanoff	Boogie Woogie Blues 	1977
PALM 28: L. "Butch" Morris / J.L. Chautemps / F. Jeanneau / A. Jaume / Ph. Maté / A. Hatot / M. Richard / J.C. Capon / J. Gilson / P.Y. Sorin / G. BrownEuropamerica 1977
PALM 29: Siracusa - Jaume - Boni	Nommo - Dans Le Caprice Amer Des Sables 1976
PALM 30: André Jaume	Le Collier De La Colombe 	1977
PALM 31: David Murray	Organic Saxophone 1978
PALM 32: David S. Ware featuring Jean-Charles Capon	From Silence To Music 1978

External links 
 

French record labels
Jazz record labels